Badreddine Missaoui was a member of the Pan-African Parliament from Tunisia.

References

Living people
Members of the Pan-African Parliament from Tunisia
Year of birth missing (living people)
Place of birth missing (living people)
21st-century Tunisian politicians